Hughes Springs is a city in Cass and Morris counties in the U.S. state of Texas. At the 2020 census, its population was 1,575. The town has heavily damaged by an EF2 tornado on November 4, 2022.

Geography

Hughes Springs is located in western Cass County at  (32.998115, –94.630542). A small portion extends west into Morris County.

The city is located along state highways 11 and 49, which run concurrently through the city limits. TX 11 leads east  to Linden, and TX 49 leads southeast  to Avinger. The two highways together lead west  to Daingerfield.

Demographics

According to the 2020 United States census, there were 1,575 people, 628 households, and 422 families residing in the city. At the 2000 census, there were 1,856 people, 777 households and 512 families residing in the city. The population density was 761.7 per square mile (293.7/km). There were 856 housing units at an average density of 351.3 per square mile (135.5/km). The racial makeup of the city was 77.10% White, 19.99% African American, 0.32% Native American, 0.05% Asian, 0.05% Pacific Islander, 1.56% from other races, and 0.92% from two or more races. Hispanic or Latino of any race were 4.15% of the population.

There were 777 households, of which 34.2% had children under the age of 18 living with them, 42.0% were married couples living together, 20.7% had a female householder with no husband present, and 34.1% were non-families. 31.7% of all households were made up of individuals, and 16.6% had someone living alone who was 65 years of age or older. The average household size was 2.34 and the average family size was 2.91.

28.5% of the population were under the age of 18, 8.9% from 18 to 24, 24.7% from 25 to 44, 18.4% from 45 to 64, and 19.5% who were 65 years of age or older. The median age was 35 years. For every 100 females, there were 80.5 males. For every 100 females age 18 and over, there were 74.1 males.

The median household income was $21,603 and the median family income was $28,333. Males had a median income of $27,813 and females $15,966. The per capita income was $14,009. About 20.2% of families and 22.8% of the population were below the poverty line, including 28.9% of those under age 18 and 15.6% of those age 65 or over.

Education
Hughes Springs is served by the Hughes Springs Independent School District and is home to the Hughes Springs High School Mustangs. The Mustang baseball team has been ranked in the national top 100, and several Mustang baseball players have gone on to play college baseball as well as college football and basketball.

Events

The city was host to the area's Passion Play.

Notable people
 Wright Patman, Former U.S. Representative

References

External links
 More on the history of Hughes Springs at the Handbook of Texas Online

Cities in Cass County, Texas
Cities in Morris County, Texas
Cities in Texas
Cities in the Ark-La-Tex